Çorum is a province in the Black Sea Region of Turkey, but lying inland and having more characteristics of Central Anatolia than the Black Sea coast. Its provincial capital is the city of Çorum, the traffic code is 19.

History

Excavations reveal that Çorum area was inhabited during the Paleolithic, Neolithic period and the 4th stage of the Calcolithic Age. Remains of these periods have been found at Büyük Güllüce, Eskiyapar and Kuşsaray.

In later times Çorum and its environs were dominated by Hittites and in the district of Boğazkale is one of the most important Hittite sites in Anatolia, the UNESCO World Heritage listed Hattusa, the capital of the Hittite Empire from 1700 BC to 1200 BC. Other important Hittite sites include the open-air temples at Yazılıkaya and Alacahöyük; royal tombs; and the excavations of Boğazköy including tablets proving tradings links between the Hittites and the Ancient Egyptians.

Later civilizations such as the Phrygians arrived here and who left remains at Pazarlı, north of Çorum. Besides the Phrygians, the Cimmerians, Medes, Persians, Galatians, Romans, Byzantines, Seljuk Turks, Danishmends, Mongol Empire (Ilkhanids), Eretnids, Kadi Burhan al-Din and finally the Ottoman Empire also arrived here. As well as the Hittite archaeology, the province also contains a number of castles, bridges and mosques dating from the Seljuk and Ottoman periods.

In 1980, Nationalist Movement Party militants perpetrated the Çorum Massacre against the Alevi Turk minority, killing 57 and injuring more than 200.

Geography

The province of Çorum is a mixture of mountains and high plateaus, some of it watered by the Kızılırmak and Yeşilırmak rivers. The province includes much attractive high meadow and mountain for walking and excursions from the city and towns.

Çorum is also known as a Geographical centre of Earth. In 2003, a revised calculation by Holger Isenberg using the higher resolution ETOPO2 global digital elevation model (DEM) with data points every 2' (3.7 km near equator) led to a more precise result of 40°52′N 34°34′E in the region of Çorum, Turkey (180 km northeast of Ankara) and thereby validated Woods' calculation.

Districts

Çorum province is divided into 14 districts (capital district in bold):

 Alaca
 Bayat
 Boğazkale
 Çorum
 Dodurga
 İskilip
 Kargı
 Laçin
 Mecitözü
 Oğuzlar
 Ortaköy
 Osmancık
 Sungurlu
 Uğurludağ

Population

 The census data of 1831 is only the central city, villages and towns are not included.
 The boxes with (-) sign are the times the before the subprovince was a subprovince.

References

External links

  Çorum governor's official website
  Çorum municipality's official website
  Çorum weather forecast information